Siegfried Ortmann (born 17 January 1937) is a German archer. He competed in the men's individual event at the 1972 Summer Olympics.

References

External links
 

1937 births
Living people
German male archers
Olympic archers of West Germany
Archers at the 1972 Summer Olympics
People from Ruhla
Sportspeople from Thuringia